Master's Academy & College, founded in 1997, and also known as Master's, Master's Academy, and Master's College, is a K-12 Christian school in Calgary, Alberta, Canada whose focus is on innovation, creativity, and foresight. Master's originally developed its teaching pedagogy through its research arm, the Profound Learning Institute. The Profound Learning Institute was then rebranded as Imaginal Education. Based on this unique model of Profound Learning/Imaginal Learning, Master's joined Palliser Regional School District's Alternative Program in 2008.

History 
The school was founded in 1997 by Tom Rudmik. Rudmik is the author of the book Becoming Imaginal and based the school on the theory outlined in the book. Its goal is to go beyond academic excellence and to prepare students by encouraging them to be creative, imaginal, and leaders of change.

Academy 
The Academy consists of grades K–6. As of 2019, Master's Academy is the number one ranked elementary school in the Province of Alberta by the Fraser Institute.

College 
The College consists of grades 7–12.

References 

Elementary schools in Calgary
Middle schools in Calgary
High schools in Calgary
Christian schools in Canada
Schools in the Palliser Regional District
Educational institutions established in 1997
1997 establishments in Canada